Junge Welt (English: Young World, stylized in its logo as junge Welt) is a German daily newspaper, published in Berlin. The jW describes itself as a left-wing and Marxist newspaper. German authorities categorize it as a far-left medium hostile to the constitutional order.

History and profile
junge Welt was first published on 12 February 1947 in the Soviet Sector of Berlin. The paper became the official newspaper of the Central Council (Zentralrat) of the Free German Youth (FDJ), the communist youth organisation, on 12 November 1947. With a daily circulation of 1.38 million, junge Welt had the largest circulation of any daily newspaper in the German Democratic Republic, even higher than the official Communist party organ Neues Deutschland.

The paper was published by Verlag Junge Welt GmbH during the East German era. The paper was allegedly sold for a symbolic price of 1 Mark to a West Berlin publishing house in 1991. It was relaunched in 1994, after German reunification and the effective dissolution of the FDJ, as Germany's most left-wing daily newspaper.  The new editorial team included both East and West German authors of different left factions. In 1997, a schism between these two camps led to the eventual foundation of the weekly Jungle World, which since strongly denounced anti-Zionist views upheld by their former colleagues. The newspaper has been accused by six of its own authors and others of not singling out Mahmoud Ahmadinejad and Iran for criticism over their nuclear "ambitions".  

Junge Welt is published by Verlag 8. Mai GmbH. The cooperative Linke Presse Verlags-Förderungs und -Beteiligungsgenossenschaft (LPG) junge Welt e.G. began preparing to take over the majority of the publishing house in 1997. The cooperative LPG junge Welt e.G.  now owns the majority of Verlag 8. Mai GmbH.  According to the Annual Report of the Federal Office for the Protection of the Constitution, "the 
national daily newspaper junge Welt is the most important printed medium in the left-wing extremist scene" in Germany. Junge Welt had an estimated print run of around 25,600–27,900 in 2017. Junge Welt unsuccessfully filed a lawsuit against being named in the report on the protection of the constitution and lost in court in March 2022.

Arnold Schölzel, who was editor-in-chief of the newspaper from 2000 to 2016, was a Stasi informant up until 1989.

See also
unsere Zeit
Media cooperative

References

External links

Cooperatives in Germany
Daily newspapers published in Germany
German-language communist newspapers
Far-left politics in Germany
Left-wing newspapers
Marxist organizations
Media cooperatives
Newspapers published in Berlin
Socialism in Germany
Publications established in 1947